Temnora scheveni is a moth of the family Sphingidae. It is known from Tanzania, Uganda and Rwanda.

The length of the forewings is 22–23 mm. It is similar to Temnora pseudopylas pseudopylas but larger and very much darker. It is immediately distinguishable from all other Temnora species with yellow on the hindwing upperside in that this colour is restricted to the basal third of the wing, not extending beyond the apex of the discal cell. The forewing upperside is dark brown and more uniformly coloured than Temnora pseudopylas pseudopylas. The hindwing upperside is yellow at the base and dark brown distally, with a conspicuous narrow yellow submarginal line.

References

Temnora
Moths described in 1968
Moths of Africa